Leonteus, may refer to:

 3793 Leonteus, a Trojan asteroid
 Leonteus (mythology), one of several Greek mythological figures
 Leonteus of Lampsacus, a 3rd-century BC pupil of Epicurus, and husband of Themista of Lampsacus